Tyloxoles boholicus is a species of beetle in the family Cerambycidae. It was described by Kriesche in 1927. It is known from the Philippines.

References

Apomecynini
Beetles described in 1927